Euchromia walkeri is a moth of the subfamily Arctiinae. It was described by George Hampson in 1898. It is found on Ternate in Indonesia.

References

 

Moths described in 1898
Euchromiina